Utting station is a railway station in the municipality of Utting am Ammersee, in Bavaria, Germany. It is located on the Mering–Weilheim line of Deutsche Bahn.

Services
 the following services stop at Utting:

References

External links
 
 Utting layout 
 

Railway stations in Bavaria
Buildings and structures in Landsberg (district)